Roberto Martínez Montoliu (born 13 July 1973) is a Spanish football coach and former professional player who is currently the head coach of the Portugal national team.

Martínez played as a defensive midfielder and began his career at Real Zaragoza, with whom he won the Copa del Rey. He spent a year at lower league side CF Balaguer, before signing for English Third Division side Wigan Athletic. Becoming part of a small Spanish contingent at the club known as "the three amigos" alongside Jesús Seba and Isidro Díaz, he was a regular first team player for six years, the longest period of time he spent at one club. During his time there, he won the Football League Third Division and the Football League Trophy. He moved to Scottish side Motherwell, then to Walsall, before joining Swansea City in 2003. He became club captain and helped the team to win promotion to League One in 2005. He moved to Chester City in 2006, and was again chosen to be captain.

In 2007, he retired from playing to become manager of Swansea City, leading them to promotion from League One as champions, establishing a possession-based style of play. He then joined Wigan Athletic in 2009, helping the club avoid relegation for three consecutive seasons. In his fourth season Wigan were relegated, but won the FA Cup in 2013 for the first time in the club's history. At the end of that season he became manager of Everton, finishing in fifth place in his first season at the club. In May 2016, he was sacked as their manager with the club in 12th position, and became Belgium's head coach on 3 August 2016. Martinez guided them to third place in 2018 FIFA World Cup, their best-ever position in the competition, as well as holding first place for Belgium in the FIFA World Rankings from 2018 to 2022. He resigned from Belgium after the 2022 FIFA World Cup. In January 2023, he was appointed as the coach of Portugal.

Early life
Born in Balaguer, Lleida, Catalonia, Martínez began his career at his home-town club CF Balaguer in the Tercera División, playing his first competitive game for the club's youth team when he was nine years old. He played at every level of youth football for the club before moving to Real Zaragoza at the age of 16.

Playing career
Martínez made his first appearance for the Real Zaragoza B team in 1991, but spent most of his first three seasons at the club playing for the youth teams. On 20 June 1993, he made his debut for the first team in La Liga on the final day of the 1992–93 season in a 2–2 draw with Atlético Madrid, coming onto the pitch as a substitute for Luis Cuartero in the 55th minute. During the following season, Martínez featured more regularly for the B team, helping the team regain promotion to the Segunda División B after being relegated in the previous season. In 1994, he returned to Balaguer to play for the first team, and also ran a football school for the club as an alternative to military service.

Martínez was offered the chance to move to England by Dave Whelan, Chairman of Wigan Athletic, and he signed on a free transfer on 25 July 1995, joining fellow Spaniards Jesús Seba and Isidro Díaz, who were collectively referred to as the "Three Amigos". He made his debut on 12 August 1995 against Gillingham, scoring for Wigan in a 2–1 defeat. He finished the 1995–96 season as the club's top goalscorer with 13 goals in all competitions, and his impressive performances were recognised when he was named in the Division Three PFA Team of the Year, and was also voted by the supporters as the club's Player of the Year.

Martínez won his first honours at the end of the following season, in 1996–97, when Wigan finished as Division Three Champions. He was once again named in the Division Three PFA Team of the Year, and was rewarded with a new four-year contract. Martínez was also at Wigan when the team won the Football League Trophy in 1999, for which he received a winners' medal despite being injured when the final was played.

Released by Wigan on a free transfer at the end of the 2000–01 season, Martínez signed a three-year deal with Scottish club Motherwell in July 2001. He made only eight appearances, plus eight more as a substitute, before having his contract terminated at the end of the season after the club had entered administration a week earlier.

He moved back to England to join First Division club Walsall on a free transfer in August 2002. Again, he did not feature regularly, starting just one game for Walsall (a home match against Reading, in which he also got sent off) and making a further five appearances as a substitute. In January 2003, Martínez joined Swansea City on a short-term contract until the end of the season, becoming the captain and helping to preserve the club's Football League status on the last day of the season. In June 2003, despite reported interest from First Division clubs, Martínez signed a new contract with Swansea. At the start of the 2004–05 season, Martínez was dropped from the squad by manager Kenny Jackett, but fought his way back into the first team, making 37 league appearances as the club won promotion to League One.

In May 2006, Martínez was released by Swansea on a free transfer. Martínez joined Chester City on a free transfer, signing a two-year contract. On 24 February 2007, he returned to Swansea City as manager on a two-year contract, replacing Kenny Jackett, who had let him go at the end of the previous season. This appointment was mostly met positively from the fans, despite him not having any managerial experience. Because his move to Swansea occurred outside the transfer window, Martínez could not register himself to play for the club for the remainder of the season. Although Martínez initially wanted to continue playing football for as long as possible, he soon felt that he would be unable to fully commit to a player-manager role, bringing his playing career to an end at the age of 33.

Managerial career

Swansea City
With Martínez in charge, Swansea lost just once in 11 games, giving them a chance of clinching a play-off place on the final day of the 2006–07 season, but missed out following a 6–3 defeat at home against Blackpool. Martínez won his first League One Manager of the Month Award for October 2007 by leading his team to four straight wins in four in the league, including a 5–0 win and a 4–1 win over Leyton Orient and AFC Bournemouth, respectively, away from home. He went on to win the Award consecutively, in December after a thrilling 3–2 win over Leeds United at the Swans' Liberty Stadium, and in January after a second 4–0 win away from home against Doncaster Rovers. He was also nominated for the February prize but lost out to John Ward, manager of Carlisle United. In April 2008, Martínez signed a new contract with Swansea as the club became League One Champions, securing promotion to the Championship, and in May 2008, he was awarded the League One Manager of the Year Award for leading Swansea to the title.

The 2008–09 season saw Martínez preside over Swansea's first game in England's second-tier division in 24 years, which began poorly with a 2–0 defeat away at Charlton Athletic. Subsequently, Swansea's form improved and they lost only four games out of the next 30, including a number of key league victories against opponents such as Reading and Wolverhampton Wanderers. Martínez also guided his team to a 2–0 FA Cup win against Premier League side Portsmouth, who were the defending cup holders.

Throughout his time at Swansea, Martínez was often linked with other managerial jobs, but he often stated that he would only leave Swansea as manager if he was "forced out." As his success grew, he publicly criticised players that left the club for money or for larger clubs. In June 2009, both Celtic and Wigan Athletic asked Swansea for permission to speak with Martínez regarding their managerial vacancies, with Wigan being granted the opportunity to hold talks with Martínez. After several days of negotiations, Martínez was confirmed as the new manager of Wigan on 15 June 2009, taking four backroom staff with him. Martínez signed a three-year contract worth £1.5 million and was assured by Wigan chairman Dave Whelan that his job would be safe for the next three years, even if the club suffered relegation.

Wigan Athletic

Martínez's move to Wigan was not without controversy. Many Swansea fans were upset that he had chosen to leave the club despite his previous comments that he would have to be "forced out" to leave the club, and he was subsequently nicknamed "El Judas" by some fans. Martínez explained that his decision had been a difficult one to make, but felt the opportunity to manage in the Premier League at the club where he began his English footballing career was too good to turn down. His first league game as Wigan manager was an away fixture against Aston Villa on 15 August 2009. Wigan won the match 2–0, and was the first season they had won an opening game in the Premier League.

In his first home game at the DW Stadium, however, the team slumped to a 1–0 defeat to newly promoted Wolverhampton Wanderers, and this was followed by a 5–0 defeat against Manchester United, despite being 0–0 at half time. This inconsistency set the tone for Martínez's first season in charge, with home wins against Chelsea, Liverpool and Arsenal, but also a series of heavy defeats. This included a 9–1 defeat away to Tottenham Hotspur on 22 November 2009, a club record defeat for Wigan, and the first time that a Premier League side had scored nine goals in a single match since Manchester United beat Ipswich Town 9–0 in 1995.

On 26 October 2010, Martínez faced his former club Swansea in the League Cup. Martínez received a hostile reception from Swansea fans as Wigan won the match 2–0. On 10 June 2011, it was announced that Martínez had turned down an approach from Aston Villa regarding their vacant managerial position.

After a good start to the 2011–12 campaign, Wigan suffered eight straight defeats to leave them at the bottom of the league. Between August and February, Wigan won a mere four games, leading to predictions that relegation to the Championship would be inevitable for Wigan. As the end of the season approached, however, Wigan's form improved dramatically as they recorded wins against Liverpool, Arsenal, Manchester United, and Newcastle United, among others. This remarkable late rally, which involved seven wins in nine games, led to Wigan finishing 15th in the league – seven points clear of relegation – and also saw Martínez awarded his first Premier League Manager of the Month Award for April 2012.

On 17 May 2012, Wigan chairman Dave Whelan confirmed that Liverpool had been given permission to discuss their managerial vacancy with Martínez. However the job eventually went to Swansea manager Brendan Rodgers. Martínez said that he wished to remain at Wigan in order to create "a legacy" at the club.

On 26 September 2012, Martínez was charged by the FA for comments made after Wigan's 4–0 loss to Manchester United on 15 September 2012. He accused match officials of favouring United at Old Trafford and said that Danny Welbeck should have been sent off.

During the 2012–13 season, Martínez led Wigan through their most successful ever FA Cup campaign as they won it for the first time in the club's history. Wigan's previous best result in the competition had been to reach the quarter-finals; Martínez led Wigan to their first Wembley semi-final after a 3–0 away win against Everton in the quarter-final. Wigan faced Millwall in the semi-final on 13 April 2013, and went on to reach their first ever FA Cup Final with a 2–0 win. They played Manchester City on 11 May, and won 1–0 with a goal in the 91st minute from substitute Ben Watson to become the 43rd different club to win the FA Cup.

Just three days after lifting the FA Cup at Wembley though, on 14 May 2013, Martínez's Wigan side were relegated from the Premier League after a 4–1 defeat against Arsenal, having been in the Premier League since promotion in 2005.

Everton

On 28 May 2013, Wigan chairman Dave Whelan announced that Martínez received permission to speak to Everton about their vacant managerial position. Whelan said that "He (Martínez) feels he's not the man to lead us back into the Premier League". Whelan said Everton chairman Bill Kenwright contacted him a week earlier for permission to speak to Martínez if talks broke down. Whelan said he gave permission "immediately", adding that he expected Everton to pay compensation of around £2 million.

On 5 June 2013, Everton confirmed the appointment of Martínez as the club's 14th manager after agreeing to a four-year contract. Everton also agreed to send a compensation package of around £1.5 million to Wigan. Kenwright had interviewed three candidates within his club, and Martínez was the only candidate who was approached while contracted to another club. Martínez brought four members of his Wigan Athletic backroom staff to Everton, following the departures of various members of David Moyes' previous backroom staff who followed him to Manchester United the same week. Graeme Jones was appointed assistant manager, Iñaki Bergara became goalkeeping coach, Richard Evans was appointed as 'Head of Performance' and former England international footballer Kevin Reeves was appointed head scout. Martínez promised to qualify Everton to the UEFA Champions League.

His first Premier League game in charge of Everton was a 2–2 draw away to Norwich City on 17 August. Martínez's first league win as Everton manager came against Chelsea on 14 September. When Everton beat West Ham United 3–2 in their next game it meant that Martínez became the first ever manager of the club to avoid defeat in his first six games. However, the run did not last as in the next fixture Fulham won 2–1 in the third round of the League Cup.

On 12 April 2014, Martínez led Everton to a 1–0 win away at Sunderland to move Everton up to fourth place in the Premier League and register a club record seventh straight Premier League win which also gave them a club record Premier League points tally with five games remaining. Eight days later, Everton won 2–0 at Goodison Park to make Martínez the first Everton manager since Harry Catterick in the 1969–70 season to record a league double over Manchester United. He eventually led the team to a 5th place finish in the league in his first season at the club. Martínez signed a new five-year contract after the season ended.

Despite finishing 5th the previous season, Everton's 2014–15 campaign was less successful. By March 2015, they had won just one of their last ten matches. A 2–0 defeat to Arsenal resulted in the Blues dropping to 14th, six points above the relegation zone. In the Europa League, Everton advanced to the round of 16, winning 7–2 on aggregate against Young Boys. Martínez's side were however knocked out after a 5–2 loss to Ukrainian side Dynamo Kiev.

On 12 May 2016, Martínez was sacked by the club, who were 12th with one game remaining. He had guided them to the semi-finals of both domestic cups that season, but fans had protested against his management and demanded his removal.

Belgium

On 3 August 2016, Martínez signed as coach of the Belgium national team, succeeding Marc Wilmots. In his first match in charge on 1 September 2016, Belgium were defeated 2–0 by his birth country Spain in Brussels.

Martinez's Belgians were the first European side to advance from qualifying into the 2018 FIFA World Cup after their 2–1 win over Greece. During the group stage, his team won all group games and in the round of 16, came from two goals down to beat Japan 3–2. In the quarter-finals, Belgium defeated Brazil 2–1 to set up a semi-final against neighbours France, which they subsequently lost 1–0. Belgium defeated England 2–0 in the third-place play-off to secure their best World Cup finish of all time.

Under Martínez, Belgium rose to first in the FIFA World Rankings in September 2018 and remained there in February 2021, without winning a single title in many years. After winning the group at Euro 2020, he became the only manager to do so at the 2018 World Cup and at that tournament. In addition, he set the record for most Belgium wins in one spell as manager (46 from 49, compared to 45 in 114 for Guy Thys; Thys won four more in a second spell). However, he was unable to guide Belgium to the title at Euro 2020, as the team suffered a blowing 1–2 defeat to Italy in the quarter-finals and was eliminated. Despite this performance in the tournament, he remained the coach of Belgium until the end of the 2022 FIFA World Cup. He became the coach with the most victories in the history of the Belgian national team after beating Belarus in the qualifying phase for the 2022 World Cup. On 20 September 2021, he again achieved a new feat: Belgium celebrated three years in a row as leader of the FIFA ranking.

Belgium entered the 2022 FIFA World Cup as second in the FIFA ranking. Despite this, Belgium were eliminated in the group stage following a 0–2 loss to Morocco and a goalless draw with Croatia, despite having beaten Canada 1–0 in the first matchday. Martinez resigned after the Croatia match, revealing that he was planning on departing Belgium after the tournament regardless of their World Cup showing.

Portugal
On 9 January 2023, Martinez was announced as the head coach of Portugal, replacing Fernando Santos.

Style of management
Martínez is often credited with establishing Swansea City's possession-based style of play during their title-winning League One campaign and subsequent rise to the Premier League. Following his departure to Wigan, succeeding Swansea managers were chosen to suit the style of football Martínez had developed, such as Brendan Rodgers, Michael Laudrup, and Graham Potter. Martínez also implemented a similar possession-based style of play at Wigan and Everton to varying degrees of success. Martínez cites the philosophy of Johan Cruyff as an influence upon his managerial approach.

A number of younger coaches including Graham Potter have studied Martinez's training methods and principles for possession-based football.

Broadcasting career
Martínez served as a studio analyst for ESPN's coverage of the FIFA World Cup (2010 and 2014 editions), the UEFA European Championship (2012 and 2016 editions), and the 2013 FIFA Confederations Cup. He has also been a regular guest on Sky Sports' Spanish football programme Revista de la Liga. In addition, he has made several appearances on the BBC's Match of the Day. In July 2020, Martinez was unveiled as one of the pundits for CBS Sports Network's UEFA Champions League coverage.

Personal life
In June 2009, Martínez married his Scottish girlfriend Beth Thompson at St Joseph's Cathedral in Swansea. The couple met in Scotland in 2002, while he was playing for Motherwell. They have two daughters together named Luella and Safiana.

While playing for Real Zaragoza, Martínez obtained a bachelor's degree in physiotherapy. He also has a postgraduate diploma in business management, which he obtained from Manchester Metropolitan University.

Managerial statistics

Honours

Player
Real Zaragoza
Copa del Rey: 1993–94

Wigan Athletic
Football League Third Division: 1996–97
Football League Trophy: 1998–99

Swansea City
Football League Trophy: 2005–06

Individual
PFA Team of the Year: 1995–96 Third Division, 1996–97 Third Division

Manager
Swansea City
Football League One: 2007–08

Wigan Athletic
FA Cup: 2012–13

Belgium
FIFA World Cup third place: 2018

Individual
League One Manager of the Year: 2007–08
Football League One Manager of the Month: October 2007, December 2007, January 2008
Premier League Manager of the Month: April 2012
LMA FA Cup Manager of the Year: 2012–13
Belgian Sports Coach of the Year: 2018 
FIFA Men's Coach nomination: 2018

See also
 List of FA Cup winning managers

References
General
 

Specific

External links

1973 births
Living people
People from Noguera (comarca)
Sportspeople from the Province of Lleida
Spanish footballers
Footballers from Catalonia
Association football midfielders
CF Balaguer footballers
Real Zaragoza players
Motherwell F.C. players
Wigan Athletic F.C. players
Walsall F.C. players
Swansea City A.F.C. players
Chester City F.C. players
Tercera División players
Segunda División B players
La Liga players
English Football League players
Scottish Premier League players
Spanish expatriate footballers
Spanish expatriate sportspeople in England
Spanish expatriate sportspeople in Scotland
Spanish expatriate sportspeople in Wales
Expatriate footballers in England
Expatriate footballers in Scotland
Expatriate footballers in Wales
Spanish football managers
Swansea City A.F.C. managers
Wigan Athletic F.C. managers
Everton F.C. managers
Belgium national football team managers
Portugal national football team managers
Premier League managers
English Football League managers
2018 FIFA World Cup managers
UEFA Euro 2020 managers
2022 FIFA World Cup managers
FA Cup winning managers
Spanish expatriate football managers
Spanish expatriate sportspeople in Belgium
Spanish expatriate sportspeople in Portugal
Expatriate football managers in Wales
Expatriate football managers in England
Expatriate football managers in Belgium
Expatriate football managers in Portugal